London Calling is a comedy play in three acts, written by Geoffrey Kerr, produced by John Golden, and directed by Dan Jarratt. The play was first performed at Little Theatre, Rochester, New York, on October 18, 1930. The star of the original production was British-born thespian St. Clair Bayfield. Geoffrey Kerr had previously performed in The Stork (1925) and also wrote short stories on the side for Vanity Fair magazine.

Plot
The comedy centres on two brothers Willie and George Craft, whose American mother and British father long have been divorced. Willie Craft has been raised in America by his mother, George by his father in London, England. When George appears for a surprise visit to Manhattan, he and Willie soon fall for a designing woman, Anne Hunter. Their mother decides she is not suitable and prevents her from seeing them, and in the process tries reconciling with their father.

Scene synopsis
Mrs. Craft's apartment on Park Avenue and George Craft's furnished apartment on East 49th Street.

Original production

Cast and characters
St. Clair Bayfield  -  Straight
Emma Bunting  -  Mary Dayton
Helen Flint  -  Anne Hunter
Penelope Hubbard  -  Jenny Fall
Geoffrey Kerr  -  George Craft
Charles Lawrence  -  Willie Craft
Edward Leiter  -  Carl Merodini
Anne Sutherland  -  Mrs. Craft
Graham Velsey  -  Chauncey Knayling
Dallas Welford  -  Blewes
Walter Wilson  -  Henry Dayton

Notes

External links
 

Broadway plays
Comedy plays
1930 plays
Plays set in New York City